Charles Mantelet (10 November 1894 – 2 May 1955) was a French cyclist who won Paris–Tours in 1918.

Major results
1913
 2nd Paris–Évreux
1914
 1st Paris–Évreux
1917
 4th Paris–Tours
1918
 1st Paris–Tours
1921
 2nd Circuit de Champagne
1923
 2nd Circuit de Paris

References

External links 

French male cyclists
1894 births
1955 deaths
Cyclists from Paris